Vorobyevsky is a rural locality (a settlement) in Zabuzansky Selsoviet, Krasnoyarsky District, Astrakhan Oblast, Russia. The population was 110 as of 2010. There are 9 streets.

Geography 
Vorobyevsky is located 7 km southwest of Krasny Yar (the district's administrative centre) by road. Zabuzan is the nearest rural locality.

References 

Rural localities in Krasnoyarsky District, Astrakhan Oblast